The Robinson R44 is a four-seat light helicopter produced by Robinson Helicopter Company since 1992. Based on the company's two-seat Robinson R22, the R44 features hydraulically assisted flight controls. It was first flown on 31 March 1990 and received FAA certification in December 1992, with the first delivery in February 1993.

The R44 has been the world's best-selling general aviation (GA) helicopter every year since 1999.  It is one of the most-produced GA aircraft of the 21st century, with 5,941 deliveries from 2001 to 2020.

Design
The R44 is a single-engined helicopter with a semi-rigid two-bladed main rotor, a two-bladed tail rotor and a skid landing gear. It has an enclosed cabin with two rows of side-by-side seating for a pilot and three passengers. Tail rotor direction of rotation on the R44 is reversed compared to the R22 for improved yaw control authority. On the R44 the advancing blade is on the bottom.

Development
Designed during the 1980s by Frank Robinson and his staff of engineers, the R44 first flew on 31 March 1990. The R44 Astro was awarded an FAA Type Certificate in December 1992, with the first deliveries taking place in January 1993. The first R44 Newscopter featuring onboard electronic news gathering equipment was delivered in 1998. In January 2000, Robinson introduced the Raven with hydraulically assisted controls and adjustable pedals. In July 2002, Robinson introduced the Raven II featuring a more powerful, fuel-injected engine and wider blades, allowing a higher gross weight and improved altitude performance.

During November 2015 Robinson announced the Cadet, a Raven I with a cargo area instead of the two back seats, a slightly less powerful engine and a more efficient muffler.

Robinson has carried out ground run testing with an aircraft diesel engine that could replace its Lycoming IO-540 avgas engine.

Operational history
In 1997, a Robinson R44 was piloted by Jennifer Murray for the first helicopter circumnavigation of the world by a woman, covering a distance of 36,000 miles in 97 days. , an R44 holds the piston speed record of 227 km/h.

Operators

Civilian operators
The aircraft is operated by many private individuals, companies and flying clubs. It is also a popular choice for law enforcement agencies.

Military and government operators

 Bolivian Air Force

 Dominican Republic Army

 Estonian Air Force

 Royal Jordanian Air Force

 Lebanese Air Force

 Mexican Navy

 Nicaraguan Air Force

 Peruvian Army

 Philippine National Police

 Air ambulances in Poland

 Forest Protection Service

South African Police Service Air Wing

 Royal Thai Army

Alaska State Troopers

Police of Uruguay

Accidents and incidents

Fuel tanks
The R44 was found to be prone to post-accident fires due to damage to the aluminum fuel tanks, allowing fuel to leak out. In 2009, the company began installing bladder-type fuel tanks in all new R44 helicopters. It also issued Service Bulletin SB-78 on 20 December 2010, requiring R44 helicopters with all-aluminum fuel tanks to be retrofitted with bladder-type tanks to "improve the R44's fuel system's resistance to a post-accident fuel leak." The company recommended that the change should be done as soon as practical, but no later than 31 December 2014. The compliance date was later moved to 30 April 2013.

An accident investigation by the Australian Transport Safety Bureau (ATSB) in March 2013 found, after analyzing historical data, that a significantly higher proportion of R44 aircraft (12%) caught fire after crashing, compared to accidents involving other types of piston-engine helicopters (7%). Preliminary analysis by the ATSB of the NTSB's accident database found a similar statistic, with 15% of accidents in the US involving R44 helicopters having post-crash fires.

Although the data did not consider which type of fuel tanks were fitted, the report mentioned four fatal accidents to the R44 fitted with bladder-type tanks, but as far as they knew, did not involve a post-accident fire. The ATSB recommended that the Australian Civil Aviation Safety Authority (CASA) take further action to urge R44 owners to fit bladder-type tanks. The FAA, the governing body in the country of manufacture whose directives would normally be followed in other countries like Australia, had not mandated the retrofit; CASA therefore issued Australian-specific airworthiness directive AD/R44/23, grounding R44 aircraft on 30 April 2013 that had not yet been upgraded.

Rotor failures
On 19 February 2015, the New Zealand Civil Aviation Authority issued an Airworthiness Directive grounding 80 of the country's R44 helicopters after two people were killed in an accident traced to a particular type of main rotor blade, the P/N C016-7 or Dash 7, which a preliminary investigation determined had failed in flight. It was the second failure or partial failure in two months. This was the largest-scale grounding of any aircraft in New Zealand's history. The CAA determined through laboratory tests that the rotor blade had failed due to overload during the crash and was not the cause of the accident and the fleet was ungrounded on 24 February 2015. The CAA left the Airworthiness Directive requiring repetitive inspections in place, however. Director of Civil Aviation Graeme Harris stated, "We don't want to see any complacency amongst operators as there is still a concern with these blades and we are waiting on test results from the USA before we review the Airworthiness notice." Following the grounding in New Zealand, Australia's Civil Aviation Safety Authority (CASA) also grounded R44 helicopters with the same rotor blades.

Specifications (R44 Raven II)

See also

References

External links

 

1990s United States helicopters
1990s United States civil utility aircraft
R44
Single-engined piston helicopters
Aircraft first flown in 1990